The Municipality of Muta is a municipality in northern Slovenia. The seat of the municipality is the town of Muta.

Settlements
In addition to the municipal seat of Muta, the municipality also includes the following settlements:
 Gortina
 Mlake
 Pernice
 Sveti Jernej nad Muto
 Sveti Primož nad Muto

References

External links

Municipality of Muta on Geopedia
 Muta municipal site 

 
Muta